"Por Ese Hombre" is a song originally recorded by Argentine duo Pimpinela and Spanish singer Dyango for the former's fifth studio album, Lucía y Joaquín (1985). It was covered by American singer Brenda K. Starr and Puerto Rican singers Tito Nieves and Victor Manuelle, as the lead single for Starr's seventh studio album, Temptation (2002). Mexican singer Ana Bárbara and Mexican band La Original Banda El Limón also recorded the song for Bárbara's eleventh studio album, Yo Soy La Mujer (2014).

Starr's version of the song peaked at number eleven on the Billboard Hot Latin Tracks chart and at number one on the Billboard Tropical/Salsa Airplay chart, leading the latter chart for eight consecutive weeks. It also managed to peak at number thirty-three on the Billboard Latin Pop Airplay chart. It became the fifth best-performing Tropical/Salsa Airplay song of 2002.

Brenda K. Starr version

Background
While choosing songs to record for the album, Starr decided upon songs she felt would showcase her growth and potential as an artist. She wanted to record songs from an array of diverse musical genres.

Musical composition
"Por Ese Hombre" was composed in minor key tonality. According to the Music Genome Project, the song's instrumentation is built in acoustic balladry, while its lyrics focus on romanticism. Its salsa section features the use of vocal call and response between the choir and the three performers. It has a BPM of 196 beats per minute.

Commercial performance
On the Billboard Hot Latin Tracks chart, the song debuted at number forty-eight for the week of March 23, 2002. It peaked at number eleven for the week of May 4, 2002. The following week, the song fell to number thirteen and a week later returned to its peak position of number eleven. A week after being sent to radio as the lead single from the album, "Por Ese Hombre" entered the Billboard Tropical/Salsa Airplay chart at number sixteen. Two weeks later, the song had reached the number three position of the chart. It later peaked at number one, replacing Gilberto Santa Rosa's "La Agarro Bajando." It led the chart for eight weeks in 2002, from April 20 until June 8. The song was replaced by Chayanne's "Y Tu Te Vas." It became Starr's second number one single on the chart, following 1997's "Herida". On the Billboard Latin Pop Airplay chart, the song debuted at number thirty-nine for the week of April 20, 2002. It peaked at number thirty-three for the week of May 18, 2002.

Critical reception
At the Latin Billboard Music Awards of 2003, the song received the awards for "Hot Latin Track of the Year, Vocal Duo" and "Tropical/Salsa Airplay Track of the Year, Female." The album received a nomination for "Tropical/Salsa Album of the Year, Female." On November 25, 2009, the official music video was uploaded to Sony Music Latin's VEVO account, where it has attained over 15 million views, as of May 2012.

Track listing
CD Single
"Por Ese Hombre" (Tropical Version) — 
"Por Ese Hombre" (Call Out Hook) —

Charts

Weekly charts

Year-end charts

See also
List of number-one Billboard Latin Tropical Airplay of 2002

References

1986 singles
1985 songs
2002 singles
2002 songs
2015 singles
2014 songs
Sony Discos singles
Brenda K. Starr songs
Pimpinela songs
Víctor Manuelle songs
Tito Nieves songs